Wilson G. Flint (d. 1867) was an American politician. He served as a Know Nothing member of the California Senate for San Francisco in the 1850s.

References

1867 deaths
Politicians from San Francisco
California Know Nothings
California state senators